Elena Viviani (born 10 October 1992) is an Italian short track speed skater who won a bronze Olympic medal at the 2014 Winter Olympics in 3000 metre relay.

References

1992 births
Living people
Italian female short track speed skaters
Olympic short track speed skaters of Italy
Olympic bronze medalists for Italy
Olympic medalists in short track speed skating
Short track speed skaters at the 2014 Winter Olympics
Medalists at the 2014 Winter Olympics
People from Sondalo
Sportspeople from the Province of Sondrio